Zasada is a surname. Notable people with the surname include:
 Artur Zasada (born 1969), Polish politician
 Mariusz Zasada (born 1982), Polish footballer
 Mariusz Zasada (gymnast) (born 1951), Polish gymnast
 Sobiesław Zasada (born 1930), Polish rally driver
 Tony Zasada (1960–1984), Canadian rower

See also
 

Polish-language surnames